Henry John Poskitt (6 September 1888 – 19 February 1950) was an English prelate of the Roman Catholic Church. He was the fourth Bishop of Leeds.

Life and ministry
Poskitt was born in the village of Birkin in the West Riding of Yorkshire (now North Yorkshire). Raised in the Church of England, he converted to the Catholic Church.

Poskitt was ordained to the Catholic priesthood on 15 July 1917 by Joseph Cowgill, then Bishop of Leeds, at the age of 28.

Poskitt then served as a curate in parishes of the diocese. On 19 August 1936, he was appointed by the Holy See as the 4th Bishop of Leeds, succeeding Cowgill. He received his episcopal consecration on 21 September from Richard Downey, Archbishop of Liverpool, with Joseph Thorman, Bishop of Hexham and Newcastle, and John Francis McNulty, Bishop of Nottingham, serving as co-consecrators.

Poskitt died 19 February 1950 and was buried at St. Edward the Confessor Church in Clifford, West Yorkshire.

References

External links
Diocese of Leeds

1888 births
1950 deaths
People from Selby District
Converts to Roman Catholicism from Anglicanism
20th-century Roman Catholic bishops in England
Burials in West Yorkshire
People educated at The King's School, Pontefract
Roman Catholic bishops of Leeds